Alicia Molik (born 27 January 1981) is an Australian former professional tennis player. She reached a career-high singles ranking of world No. 8 and a career-high doubles ranking of world No. 6.

Molik won a bronze medal in singles for Australia at the 2004 Summer Olympics by upsetting the then-world No. 3 and reigning French Open champion Anastasia Myskina. She also won the 2004 Zurich Open, defeating Maria Sharapova in the final, and reached the quarterfinals of the 2005 Australian Open. Molik won Grand Slam doubles titles at the 2005 Australian Open with Svetlana Kuznetsova, and at the 2007 French Open with Mara Santangelo. She also reached the finals of three mixed doubles Grand Slam tournaments: the 2004 Wimbledon Championships, the 2004 US Open, and the 2007 Wimbledon Championships.

Shortly after the 2005 Australian Open, Molik contracted an inner-ear infection. The infection developed into vestibular neuronitis, which kept her out of competition until May 2006. Molik was never able to replicate her pre-ailment singles results, even though she returned to the top 60 a year later. She retired in August 2008, but she returned a year later in September 2009. Her last match was a second round defeat at the 2011 Australian Open to Nadia Petrova.

Career
She won her first Grand Slam doubles title at the 2005 Australian Open with partner Svetlana Kuznetsova. She reached the top ten on the WTA tour for the first time in early 2005 following her first Grand Slam quarterfinal singles appearance, at the Australian Open, where she lost 7–9 in the final set to Lindsay Davenport.

Molik won the bronze medal at the 2004 Summer Olympics in Athens in the women's singles competition beating then world No. 3 Anastasia Myskina in straight sets 6–3, 6–4.

She won the Zurich Open, a Tier I tournament, defeating Maria Sharapova 4–6, 6–2, 6–3 in the final.

2005: Rise to the top 10
Molik began 2005 by partnering Mark Philippoussis in the Hopman Cup. She played in the Sydney International, defeating unseeded players the entire way through the tournament before taking the title over compatriot Samantha Stosur in the final, 6–7, 6–4, 7–5. Molik played in the Australian Open as the 10th seed. She defeated Anabel Medina Garrigues in the first round, Aiko Nakamura in the second round and Tatiana Panova in the third round to set up a meeting with 8th seed Venus Williams in the fourth round. Molik defeated Williams in straight sets 7–5, 7–6 to become the first Australian woman to reach the Australian Open quarterfinals since 1988. Molik played in her first ever grand slam quarterfinal against top seed Lindsay Davenport. Davenport defeated Molik in a marathon three set match, 6–4, 4–6, 9–7. Molik won her first grand slam doubles title with Svetlana Kuznetsova. After the Australian Open, Molik rose into the top 10 in singles for the first time in her career, at No. 10.

Molik played in the Proximus Diamond Games in Antwerp, making the semifinals before losing to Amélie Mauresmo 6–3, 7–6. However, she defeated Mauresmo in the Tier II Qatar Total Open semifinals 7–6, 6–1 to set up a meeting with second seed Maria Sharapova. Sharapova defeated Molik in the final 4–6, 6–1, 6–4. Molik rose to No. 8 after the tournament.

As the 7th seed at the Tier I Indian Wells tournament, Molik made the fourth round before losing to a returning Justine Henin 4–6, 6–2, 2–6. This was the second last time in 2005 that Molik won past the first round of a tournament.

After crashing out of the tournament in Amelia Island, to Virginie Razzano 4–6, 4–6, Molik took an extended break due to an inner ear infection, which caused her to miss the entire clay court season including the French Open. Molik returned for the grass court season in Birmingham, however, lost in the second round after a first round bye to Laura Granville 4–6, 2–6. Molik took another long break, missing Wimbledon, due to the ear infection.

She played only one lead in tournament for the US Open, losing in the first round to Gisela Dulko 2–6, 4–6. Seeded 14th at the US Open, she lost in the first round to Shenay Perry 4–6, 4–6. Molik won her last match of 2005 at the tournament in Bali as the third seed, making the second round before losing to Alona Bondarenko of Ukraine 4–6, 2–6. Molik lost in the first round in her last four tournaments of the year, Beijing, Filderstadt, Moscow and Zurich. She finished the year ranked 29th, with a 17–14 record.

Ear infection
In late 2005, Molik was diagnosed with vestibular neuronitis, an inner-ear condition caused by a virus that affected her balance, vision and energy level. In October 2005, she announced that she would be taking an extended break through the 2006 season in order to recover. Molik could have been part of the team for Australia's Fed Cup group matches in April, but Australian Davis Cup Captain, David Taylor announced that she would not be selected due to lack of match play and rustiness. Instead, rookie Casey Dellacqua took her place.

2006: Return from illness
Molik made her return from the ear infection at the Italian Open in 2006, losing in the first round to Katarina Srebotnik 2–6, 0–6, and lost to Austrian Tamira Paszek 7–5, 4–6, 4–6 in the first round in Istanbul. Molik won her first match since returning at the 2006 French Open, reaching the third round after defeating two relative unknowns and then losing to 4th seeded Maria Sharapova 0–6, 5–7.

Molik played a Wimbledon warm up in the Netherlands, losing in the first round to 5th Seed Ana Ivanovic 1–6, 6–3, 2–6. At Wimbledon, she reached the second round by defeating Yung-Jan Chan 7–6, 6–1, but lost to 21st seed Katarina Srebotnik, 2–6, 1–6.

Molik lost in the first round of Stockholm, Montreal and New Haven. She had high hopes for the US Open, but was shocked 6–3, 6–2 in the first round by the 17-year-old Vania King. She gained revenge over King in the first round of the Guangzhou Open, reaching the quarterfinals after also scoring an upset victory over a top 50 player Lourdes Domínguez Lino and lost to 1st seed Jelena Janković 3–6, 5–7. After these wins Molik broke back into the top 200 at 179 and played in Tokyo where she defeated Jelena Kostanić 7–5, 6–3, before losing in the second round to Jamea Jackson 3–6, 1–6. Molik suffered first round defeats in Bangkok, losing again to Vania King 1–6, 5–7, and Zürich, losing to Shahar Pe'er 1–6, 2–6. Molik finished the year by losing in the first round of qualifying at the Generali Ladies Linz, 6–3, 5–7, 4–6 to Yaroslava Shvedova.

2007: Comeback gains momentum
Molik won a wildcard into the Australian Open by winning the Australian Open wildcard play-offs, where she defeated 16-year-old Australian Jessica Moore in the final 6–4, 6–4. In preparation for the Australian Open, Molik competed in the Hopman Cup in Perth and scored victories over world No. 6 Nadia Petrova, and Ashley Harkleroad. Her final Australian Open warm up tournament was the Hobart International where she reached the quarterfinals, beating two higher ranked opponents on her way before losing to doubles partner Sania Mirza. Molik also reached the doubles quarterfinals in Hobart with Mirza, before losing a close match to the No. 2 seeds.

During the Australian Open, Alicia Molik won through her first and second round matches against rising Chinese Taipei's Yung-Jan Chan 6–2, 7–6, and Estonian Kaia Kanepi 1–6, 6–3, 6–2, before losing a three-setter against the 8th seed Patty Schnyder of Switzerland, 6–3, 2–6, 0–6. With her impressive 3rd round performance, Molik improved her then-141 ranking to inside the top 100, the first time since withdrawing from numerous tournaments due to that ear infection.

After the Australian Open, Molik reached the second round in Pattya, Bangalore, Dubai and Doha, before playing in Indian Wells, where she reached the third round, losing to 10th seed Ana Ivanovic 2–6, 1–6. Molik had three consecutive first round losses, in Miami, Amelia Island and Charleston. She finally won a match in the clay season, in Strasbourg, before losing to Anabel Medina Garrigues. Molik competed in the French Open, losing in the first round to 9th seed Anna Chakvetadze 2–6, 3–6. However, Molik teamed with Mara Santangelo to win her second Grand Slam doubles title at the French Open.

Molik played in two Wimbledon warm up tournaments, reaching the second round in Birmingham, however, lost in the first round in Eastbourne to Melanie South 6–1, 3–6, 6–7. Molik was able to rebound, and easily won her first round match at Wimbledon, defeating Anastasia Rodionova 6–3, 6–2, before losing in the second round to Serena Williams 6–7, 3–6. Molik and Santangelo, the 6th seeds in the doubles tournament, made it to the semifinals before losing to eventual champions Cara Black and Liezel Huber. Also competing in the mixed doubles, Molik and partner Jonas Björkman made the final, before losing to Jelena Janković and Jamie Murray.

Molik lost in the first round of two lead-in US Open tournaments, in Forest Hills and New Haven, before then falling in the first round at the US Open to Katarina Srebotnik. After the Open, Molik reached the quarterfinals in Guangzhou, losing to Dominika Cibulková, and at the Japan Open in Tokyo, losing to Venus Williams 6–7, 3–6. Losses followed in the first round of the Kremlin Cup, and in qualifying at Zurich, before Molik qualified for the Generali Ladies Linz, reaching the main-draw second round where she lost to 6th seed Patty Schnyder, 4–6, 4–6.

Molik finished the year ranked 60 in the world, with a 25–24 singles record.

2008: Retirement
In 2008, she entered the Perth Hopman Cup where she defeated Lucie Šafářová 7–5, 6–2 in the first round of the round-robin competition, before losing to Sania Mirza and Serena Williams in ties involving India and the United States respectively. Her second competition of 2008 was the Medibank International where she again faced Šafářová, Šafářová winning 7–6, 7–6. Molik won her opening round at the Australian Open against Estonia's Kaia Kanepi, before falling to 18-year-old Czech sensation Nicole Vaidišová, 2–6, 3–6.

Molik's singles ranking continued to fall due to an elbow problem. Molik lost in the first round of singles qualifying at the French Open and Wimbledon in 2008, and did not win a main-draw match after January 2008. Molik has enjoyed erratic results in doubles, where she partnered Sun Tiantian and defeated Cara Black and Liezel Huber who were the top-seeds at the tournament in Sydney. She partnered Mara Santangelo at Wimbledon and the French Open, but fell in the first round of competition.
Molik received a wildcard into the Beijing Olympics which she stated was "the best news I've had since 2004." Representing Australia alongside fellow countrywomen Sam Stosur and Casey Dellacqua, Molik was ousted in the first round by Spanish María José Martínez Sánchez 6–2, 6–2.

On 5 September, Molik announced her retirement from professional tennis after experiencing nagging leg and elbow problems.

She worked for six months as a commentator before announcing her comeback.

2009: Comeback
On 30 July 2009, Molik announced that she planned to embark on a comeback to tour tennis, claiming to be free of injury. Her first comeback tournament was in the 2009 New Haven doubles event. She entered the women's doubles at the Pilot Pen Tennis event as a wildcard with Meghann Shaughnessy, losing to the Spanish duo of María José Martínez Sánchez and Nuria Llagostera Vives.

Molik lost her first-round doubles match with Shaughnessy at the US Open against Līga Dekmeijere and Julie Ditty 6–7(4), 1–6.

In September 2009, Molik entered a $25,000 ITF tournament in Darwin, which she won in both singles and doubles. Molik won the doubles with compatriot Casey Dellacqua (who is also on a comeback trail) and won the singles over rising star Monika Wejnert 3–6, 6–3, 6–1. Molik backed up with a win at the Bendigo ITF event. She won another ITF event in Mildura, and reached the semifinals of another ITF event in Perth. Molik then made it through to the Australian Open wildcard playoff quarterfinals after winning three out of three round-robin matches, however, suffered a shock loss to teenager Jessica Moore.

2010: Return to tour level tennis and final retirement

After great success during the last three months of the 2009 season in ITF tournaments, Molik started 2010 ranked back inside the top 200.

Molik started her 2010 campaign at the Brisbane International. She defeated Ekaterina Makarova in the first round 6–4, 1–6, 6–4. In the second round, Molik was made to rethink her comeback on the WTA Tour, losing to eventual champion Kim Clijsters 0–6, 3–6. After the disappointing loss, she travelled to Hobart to play the Moorilla International. In her first round match, she defeated her former doubles partner Sania Mirza in three sets. But just like her results at Brisbane, she lost in a much tighter second round 6–7, 6–3, 3–6 to Carla Suárez Navarro. Needing more matches under her belt, Molik decided to play with compatriot Jelena Dokić in the doubles event at the same tournament. However, they lost in a very tight first round match 6–7, 7–6, [2–10].

Molik took part in both singles and doubles at the Australian Open with Meghann Shaughnessy. In singles, Molik lead 6–3, 5–2 before she lost to Julie Coin 6–3, 6–7, 3–6.

Molik played in Australia's Fed Cup World Group II tie against Spain, however, she lost heavily in the reverse singles to Carla Suárez Navarro 1–6, 1–6. Molik played in the Dubai Tennis Championships, where she defeated Australian Open semifinalist and 16th seed Zheng Jie 6–3, 4–6, 6–2 in the first round, and then lost to fellow qualifier Anna-Lena Grönefeld 4–6, 4–6. She lost in the first round of the Malaysian Open to Alisa Kleybanova, 1–6, 4–6.

Molik accepted a wild card into the Premier Mandatory event at Indian Wells. In the first round, she defeated Tatjana Malek 6–3, 6–1, and then pulled off an upset by defeating the 29th seed Anabel Medina Garrigues 6–4, 5–7, 7–6. Molik played Elena Baltacha in the 3rd round, dominating the match with a 6–0, 6–2 victory. She lost to Zheng Jie in the fourth round. In the first round of the Sony Ericsson Open in Miami Molik defeated Ashley Harkleroad in her comeback match 6–1, 6–1 in 45 minutes. In doubles, Molik has partnered with the 2009 Sony Ericsson doubles champion Svetlana Kuznetsova. Molik lost in the first round of the 2010 French Open to Janković 0–6, 4–6.

Personal life
Molik was an Australian Institute of Sport scholarship holder. She married Tim Sullivan in February 2011 and gave birth to their first child, a son, in 2012.

Significant finals

Grand Slam tournament finals

Women's doubles: 2 titles

Mixed doubles: 3 runners-up

WTA Tier I & Premier Mandatory/Premier 5 finals

Singles: 1 title

Doubles: 1 title

Career finals

Singles wins (5)

Singles finalist (4)
 2003: Sarasota (lost to Anastasia Myskina)
 2003: Budapest (lost to Magüi Serna)
 2004: Vienna (lost to Anna Smashnova)
 2005: Doha (lost to Maria Sharapova)

Doubles
Wins (7)

Olympics

Singles: 1 bronze medal

Performance timelines

Singles

Doubles

See also
 List of female tennis players

References

External links
 
 
 
 
 
 
 
 

1981 births
Australian people of Polish descent
Australian female tennis players
Australian Open (tennis) champions
French Open champions
Olympic bronze medalists for Australia
Olympic tennis players of Australia
Sportswomen from South Australia
Australian Institute of Sport tennis players
Sportswomen from Victoria (Australia)
Sportswomen from Western Australia
Tennis players at the 2000 Summer Olympics
Tennis players at the 2004 Summer Olympics
Tennis players at the 2008 Summer Olympics
Olympic medalists in tennis
Hopman Cup competitors
Grand Slam (tennis) champions in women's doubles
Grand Slam (tennis) champions in girls' doubles
Medalists at the 2004 Summer Olympics
Living people
Tennis players from Adelaide
Tennis players from Melbourne
Tennis players from Perth, Western Australia
Australian Open (tennis) junior champions
21st-century Australian women